is a 1998 3D fighting arcade game developed and published by Konami. It is Konami's second attempt in the 3D arcade fighting game market after their 1997 3D arcade fighting game Fighting Bujutsu. It is powered by the Konami M2 Hardware, which is Konami's version of the Panasonic M2. Like Fighting Bujutsu, Battle Tryst was never ported to any home console after its arcade release.

Battle Tryst uses a three-button 8-way joystick layout that is similar to the one in Sega's Virtua Fighter series, as well as the time release being adopted from Namco's Tekken series.

The opening and character endings use real Japanese animation. Film director Mamoru Oshii took charge of the storyboard of the animations, while Shujiro Hamakawa designed the characters. SHEMON and RHETER were planned to appear in Battle Tryst, as well as Madoka from the TwinBee series, but all three were canceled.

Fighters
 

 

Hidden fighters

 (Elaine Shea) - The "Fairy" character from Konami's Gaiapolis arcade game.
 - Pilot of WinBee from Konami's TwinBee series.

References

External links
Article about Battle Tryst 

Battle Tryst at arcade-history

1998 video games
3D fighting games
Arcade video games
Arcade-only video games
Konami games
Multiplayer video games
Fighting games
Konami arcade games
Video games developed in Japan